Kukicha (茎茶), or twig tea, also known as bōcha (棒茶), is a Japanese blend made of stems, stalks, and twigs. It is available as a green tea or in more oxidised processing.  Kukicha has a unique flavour and aroma among teas, due to its being composed of parts of the tea plant that are excluded from most other teas.

Regular kukicha material comes from production of sencha or matcha.

Karigane has historically been the name of kukicha made from leaves used for gyokuro green tea. However, these days the term karigane has become diverse, and is also used for any kukicha of high quality. Karigane that is specifically from Kyushu is called shiraore.  

Kukicha has a mildly nutty and slightly creamy sweet flavour. It is made of four sorts of stems, stalks, and twigs of Camellia sinensis. Green varieties are best steeped for less than one minute. Oversteeping or steeping too hot, as with all green teas,  results in a bitter, unsavoury brew.

It is common to steep kukicha for three or four infusions.

Kukicha is one of the preferred teas of the macrobiotic diet.

References 

Green tea
Japanese tea
Japanese cuisine terms